Exochellidae is a family of bryozoans belonging to the order Cheilostomatida.

Genera:
 Escharoides Milne Edwards, 1836
 Exochella Jullien, 1888

References

Bryozoan families